Agueda Moroni Melgarejo (born 6 March 1997) is an Argentinian born, Italian field hockey player.

Personal life
Agueda Moroni was born and raised in Córdoba, Argentina.

She spent 2016–17 studying at Liberty University in Lynchburg, Virginia.

Career

Club hockey 
Moroni currently plays in the Liga Iberdrola in Spain, for Canarian team Taburiente.

In 2019 Moroni travelled around the globe playing hockey, representing Midlands in the National Hockey League in New Zealand, as well as the Perth Thundersticks in Australia's Sultana Bran Hockey One League.

National team
Moroni made her debut for the Italian national team in 2021 at the EuroHockey Championships in Amsterdam. She went on to represent the team again later that year at the European Qualifier for the 2022 FIH World Cup, held in Pisa.

References

External links
 
 
 

1997 births
Living people
Italian female field hockey players
Field hockey players from Buenos Aires